Made Flesh is the second album by the experimental rock band Extra Life. 

According to Rock-A-Rolla magazine, the album is "darker, harder and bleaker" than its predecessor, Secular Works. Writing in The Quietus, Noel Gardner described it as "the best album of [2010]."

Track listing
"Voluptuous Life" – 2:07
"The Ladder" – 6:27
"Made Flesh " – 4:57
"One Of Your Whores " – 5:03
"Easter" – 6:13
"Black Hoodie " – 3:24
"Head Shrinker" – 4:07
"The Body Is True" – 11:15

Personnel
 Charlie Looker: Guitar, Vocals
 Travis Laplante: keyboards, tenor sax, EWI
 Anthony Gedrich: bass, contrabass
 Nick Podgurski: drums, percussion
 Caley Monahon-Ward: violin, mandolin, engineer
 Ian Antonio: glockenspiel, vibraphone, crotales, wood block
 Larkin Grimm: backing vocals on "One of Your Whores" and "Head Shrinker".

All music and lyrics by Charlie Looker

References

2010 albums
Extra Life (band) albums